Marko Zorić (born July 10, 1980 in Zrenjanin) is a retired Serbian footballer who last played for FK Banat Zrenjanin.

Club career
Marko Zorić began his professional football career with top tier side Proleter Zrenjanin where he would gradually start to establish himself within the team and attract the interests of Serbian heavyweights Partizan Belgrade who he would  join in the 2000-01 league season. His time at Partizan Belgrade was however very disappointing and he saw very little playing time, which saw a move to second tier club FK Teleoptik go through. With FK Teleoptik he'll see them relegated to the third tier, however during this period he would go on to establish himself as an integral member of the team and a return to Proleter Zrenjanin in the 2004-05 league season, who were now in the second tier.

After a season with Proleter Zrenjanin Marko Zorić would move abroad to China and join top tier side Tianjin Teda in the 2005 Chinese Super League where he immediately established himself as an integral member of the team and helped guide Tianjin to fourth within the league, which was the best placed finish for the team since the league became fully professional. Two seasons later Marko Zorić would have a chance to return to Serbia and he'll join top tier side Banat Zrenjanin in the 2006–07 Serbian SuperLiga, however he couldn't establish himself as a first choice player and left after a season to join top tier Turkish side Gençlerbirliği in the 2007–08 Süper Lig but once again this was short lived and he returned to Banat Zrenjanin where this time he was able to gain significantly more playing time but also saw the club relegated at the end of the 2008–09 Serbian SuperLiga.

On July 15, 2009 Marko Zorić was looking for a move back to the Chinese Super League and recently promoted side Jiangsu Sainty were interested in his services until he sustained an injury during training, however fellow Super League side Shenzhen Asia Travel were willing to take a chance and signed him in their fight against relegation in the 2009 Chinese Super League season. The following season Zorić would return to Tianjin Teda and once again became an integral member of the team's defence and go on to win 2011 Chinese FA Cup with them.

Honours
Tianjin Teda
Chinese FA Cup: 2011

References

External links
 Profile and stats at Srbijafudbal.
 Profile at TFF.org

1980 births
Living people
Sportspeople from Zrenjanin
Serbian footballers
Serbian expatriate footballers
Association football defenders
FK Proleter Zrenjanin players
FK Partizan players
FK Teleoptik players
FK Banat Zrenjanin players
Shenzhen F.C. players
Tianjin Jinmen Tiger F.C. players
Gençlerbirliği S.K. footballers
Serbian expatriate sportspeople in China
Chinese Super League players
Serbian SuperLiga players
Süper Lig players
Expatriate footballers in Turkey
Expatriate footballers in China